Physopyxis lyra is a species of thorny catfish found in the Essequibo and Amazon basins.  It occurs in the countries of Brazil, Colombia, Guyana and Peru.  This species grows to a length of  SL.  This species prefers to live amongst submerged organic debris.

References 

 

Doradidae
Fish of Guyana
Freshwater fish of Brazil
Freshwater fish of Colombia
Freshwater fish of Peru
Fish of the Amazon basin
Fish described in 1872
Taxa named by Edward Drinker Cope